John Sinclair Leckie was a Scottish amateur football centre forward who played in the Scottish League for Queen's Park.

Personal life 
Leckie worked as a commercial traveller. In December 1916, over two years since the beginning of the First World War, Leckie enlisted in the Argyll and Sutherland Highlanders and rose to the rank of sergeant.

Career statistics

References 

1888 births
Scottish footballers
Scottish Football League players
British Army personnel of World War I
Footballers from Glasgow
Association football forwards
Queen's Park F.C. players
Date of death missing
Argyll and Sutherland Highlanders soldiers
People from Maryhill